Mohammad-Saleh Khalil-Azad (born 17 April 1990 in Shiraz) is an Iranian professional football goalkeeper who currently plays for Fajr Sepasi.

Club career

Club career statistics

External links
Mohammad Saleh Khalil-Azad at PersianLeague.com

1990 births
Living people
Iranian footballers
Bargh Shiraz players
Rah Ahan players
Fajr Sepasi players
Footballers at the 2010 Asian Games
Association football goalkeepers
Asian Games competitors for Iran
People from Shiraz
Sportspeople from Fars province